Bhatar Assembly constituency is an assembly constituency in Purba Bardhaman district in the Indian state of West Bengal.

Overview
As per orders of the Delimitation Commission, No. 267 Bhatar  assembly constituency covers Bhatar community development block and Kurman I and Kshetia gram panchayats of Burdwan I CD Block.

Bhatar  assembly segment was earlier part of Burdwan (Lok Sabha constituency). As per orders of Delimitation Commission it is part of No. 39 Bardhaman-Durgapur (Lok Sabha constituency).

Members of Legislative Assembly

Election results

2021

2016

2011

 

.# Swing calculated on Congress+Trinamool Congress vote percentages in 2006 taken together.

1977-2006
Syed  Md. Masih of CPI (M) won the Bhatar assembly seat in 2006 defeating his nearest rival Banamali Hajra of Trinamool Congress. Contests in most years were multi cornered but only winners and runners are being mentioned. In 2001 and 1996, Subhas Mondal  of CPI (M) defeated Banamali Hajra of Trinamool Congress and  Susanta Ghosh of Congress, in respective years. In 1991, Mahboob Zahedi of CPI (M) defeated Bholanath Sen of Congress. In 1987 and 1982, Syed Md. Masih of CPI (M) defeated Banamali Hajra and Bholanath Sen, both of Congress, in the respective years. In 1977, Bholanath Sen defeated Saktipada Chattopdahyay of Forward Bloc.

1957-1972
Bholanath Sen of Congress won the seat in 1972. Anath Bandhu Ghosh of CPI (M) won it in 1971. In 1969, Aswini Roy of CPI won the seat. S.Hazra of Congress, won it in 1967. Aswini Roy, representing CPI won it in 1962. The constituency was formed in 1957. It was won in that year by Abalata Kundu of Congress.

References

Politics of Paschim Bardhaman district
Assembly constituencies of West Bengal
Politics of Purba Bardhaman district